The Amazon weasel (Neogale africana), also known as the tropical weasel, is a species of weasel native to South America. It was first identified from a museum specimen mislabelled as coming from Africa, hence the scientific name.

Taxonomy 
Originally described in the genus Mustela, a 2021 study reclassified it into the genus Neogale along with 2 other former Mustela species, as well as the two species formerly classified in Neovison.

Description
They have a typical body form for weasels, with a long, slender, torso and short legs and ears. They have short fur which varies from reddish to dark brown on the upper body, and is pale orange-tan on the underparts. A stripe of fur the same colour as that on the upper body runs down the centre of the chest and throat. The whiskers are short and the soles of the feet almost hairless. Females have three pairs of teats.

Distribution and habitat
Amazon weasels are known to inhabit the Amazon basin in northern Brazil and eastern Peru and Ecuador. However, the full extent of their range is unknown, and they probably also inhabit southern Colombia, Venezuela and the Guyanas, as well as northern Bolivia. The region is covered by tropical rainforest, and, while detailed habitat preferences are unknown, the weasel has mostly been recovered near rivers.

Two subspecies are recognised:

 N. a. africana (northeastern Brazil)
 N. a. stolzmanni (northwestern Brazil, Peru, Ecuador)

Biology and behaviour
The Amazon weasel is rarely seen and little is known of its habits. They eat rodents and other small mammals, and have been reported to construct burrows in the stumps of hollow trees.

References

Weasels
Fauna of the Amazon
Carnivorans of South America
Mammals of Brazil
Mammals of Ecuador
Mammals of Peru
Mammals described in 1818
Taxobox binomials not recognized by IUCN